Stormsvlei is a town on the southern bank of the Riviersonderend, some 17 km south of Bonnievale and 50 km north of Bredasdorp. Of Afrikaans origin, the name means 'storm marsh'.

References

Populated places in the Swellendam Local Municipality